The former Woodmen of the World Building in Omaha, Nebraska, was located at 1323 Farnam Street. Built in 1912 by the architectural firms of Holabird & Roche and Fisher and Lawrie, the building was the headquarters of Woodmen of the World (WOW) from 1912 until 1934. WOW relocated in 1934 to the Bee Newspaper Building at 17th and Farnam, also known as the Insurance Building.

History
The first WOW building in Omaha was the 1885 Sheely Building, occupied by WOW in 1890 soon after the Woodmen of the World was organized. The company then purchased the Sheely Building in 1900 for $60,000 and applied its own name to the headquarters, but the building was too small for a rapidly growing business.

The new WOW building would be 19 stories, the tallest building between Chicago and the West coast, at the time of its dedication in 1912. It was the tallest building in Downtown Omaha from 1912 to 1919.

The Italian Renaissance skyscraper featured exterior decorations of pink granite and terracotta. It included a motor operated revolving door opening into a lobby with a 30-foot high ceiling. Six elevators carried tenants to the upper floors. The building was demolished in 1977.

WOW built its current 30-story Woodmen Tower in 1969. It was Omaha's tallest building until the completion of the 45-story First National Bank Tower in 2002.

See also
List of tallest buildings in Omaha, Nebraska
Yule marble

References

External links
Postcard view of the Sheely Building First WOW building in Omaha
History of the Woodmen of the World
Historic photos of Omaha Includes WOW building
Floor plans from the Architectural Record (1912)

Office buildings completed in 1912
Buildings and structures demolished in 1977
History of Downtown Omaha, Nebraska
Demolished buildings and structures in Omaha, Nebraska
Woodmen of the World buildings
1912 establishments in Nebraska
Skyscraper office buildings in Omaha, Nebraska
Former skyscrapers
1977 disestablishments in Nebraska
Buildings and structures demolished by controlled implosion